Siloxides are chemical compounds with the formula R3SiOM, where R is usually an organic group and M is usually a metal cation.  Also called silanoates, they are derived by deprotonation of silanols.  They also arise by the degradation of siloxanes by base:
R3SiOSiR3  +  2 NaOH   →   2 R3SiONa  +  H2O 

Cleavage of cyclic siloxanes affords siloxides:
(Me2SiO)3 +  MeLi  →  Me3SiOSiMe2OSiMe2OLi

These anions function as ligands for metal ions, forming complexes similar to metal alkoxides.  Sodium trimethylsiloxide is useful for generating metal complexes by salt metathesis reactions.  A very bulky siloxide is tert-butyl3SiO−, sometimes called silox.

Siloxides are weaker net donors than alkoxides because pπ-d donation has to compete with backbonding from the oxygen atom into the low-lying Si-C σ* orbitals.

References
 

Organosilicon compounds